Mohammed Dib Zaitoun (born 20 February 1951) is a former head of the Syrian General Security Directorate and a close adviser of Syrian President Bashar al-Assad. He is one of many officials sanctioned by the European Union for their actions against protesters participating in the Syrian civil war.

Background 
Maj Gen Dib Zaitoun was born in Damascus to a Sunni family. His father was a Sergeant in the Syrian Army. He was commissioned as a Lieutenant in a Mechanized Infantry regiment in the Syrian Arab Army in November 1971 after graduating from the 3-year long officer course at the Homs Military Academy. Before taking up his current position as head of the General Security Directorate, he was the head of the Political Security Directorate (PSD). He took over the PSD position in 2009 after the previous head Muhammad Mansoura was removed because of his involvement in organized smuggling activity on the Syrian Iraqi border. Before being head of the PSD, Dib Zaitoun had been the deputy head of the General Security Directorate during which time he was asked, along with other members of the president's inner circle, to investigate the assassination in 2008 of Hezbollah’s Imad Mughniyeh in Damascus.

Syrian uprising 
At the start of the Syrian uprising, Dib Zaitoun became one of nine members of the government’s Central Crisis Management Cell which was tasked with handling the protests and the violent crack down on protesters. After the 18 July 2012 bombing of the crisis management cell and the death of four key members of the crisis management team, Dib Zaitoun was elevated to head the General Security Directorate and his previous position as head of the Political Security Directorate was taken over by Rustum Ghazali.

References

1951 births
Living people
People of the Syrian civil war
Syrian generals
Directors of intelligence agencies
Syrian Sunni Muslims

Syrian individuals subject to the European Union sanctions